African Entomology is a scientific journal published by the Entomological Society of Southern Africa.

External links 
 

Entomology journals and magazines
Publications established in 1993
English-language journals
Biannual journals
Academic journals published by learned and professional societies